Aivaras Balžekas (April 8, 1982 – October 10, 2005) was a Lithuanian professional tennis player and a member of the Lynn University's tennis team.

Balzekas was a member of Lithuania Davis Cup team and earned a career high ATP singles ranking of world no. 926 in 2002.  He played for one season at Lynn in Boca Raton, Florida, and had earned several honors and titles, including finishing the 2005 season ranked 11th in American college tennis. This continued a successful career that began at the Auburn University-Montgomery, where he was a member of the 2004 NAIA national championship team.

Balzekas died at a Florida hospital where he was taken after being struck by a car. The accident occurred on October 8, 2005. At the time he was helping a friend push a disabled vehicle along the side of a road. A Boca Raton man named David Walsh was sentenced to a year and one day in prison for the death of Balzekas. He pleaded guilty to driving drunk and killing Balzekas.

References

External links
 
 
 

1982 births
2005 deaths
Auburn University at Montgomery alumni
Lithuanian expatriate sportspeople in the United States
Lithuanian male tennis players
Lynn Fighting Knights men's tennis players
Pedestrian road incident deaths
Road incident deaths in Florida